Magma is the self-titled debut album by French rock band Magma. Released as a double-LP in 1970, it is a concept album which tells the story of a group of people fleeing a doomed Earth to settle on the fictional planet Kobaïa. Except for the first song, which is sung in English, all lyrics are sung in the Kobaïan language invented by the band. Although initially self-titled, the album was later reissued under the name Kobaïa.

Track listing

Legacy
The title track, "Kobaïa", has been played as a regular part of Magma concerts since its original recording, although in a jazzier version akin to that of the version on the live album Live/Hhaï (1975), which also featured new lyrics, in Kobaïan, instead of English.

Personnel

Performance
 Klaus Blasquiz – vocals
 François Cahen – piano
 Alain "Paco" Charlery – trumpet, percussion
 Claude Engel – guitars, flute, vocals
 Teddy Lasry – soprano sax, flute
 Francis Moze – electric bass, contrabass
 Richard Raux – alto and tenor sax, flute
 Christian Vander – drums, vocals

Production
 Claude Martelot – engineer
 Laurent Thibault – production
 Lee Hallyday – production supervision
 Louis Haig Sarkissian – stage manager
 M. J. Petit – make-up
 Marcel Engel – technical assistant
 Roger Roche – engineer

References

External links
Explanation of each track
 

1970 debut albums
Concept albums
Jazz albums by French artists
Magma (band) albums
Philips Records albums